Julia Evans Reed (September 11, 1960 – August 28, 2020) was a Mississippi Delta born author, journalist, columnist, speaker, and socialite. Reed wrote several books on cooking, entertaining, and affluent  southern lifestyle and culture.

Early life 
Reed was born in Greenville, Mississippi, and attended the Madeira School, a boarding school in McLean, Virginia. She studied at Georgetown University and American University, both in Washington, D.C. Her father, Clarke Reed, is a businessman and former Republican Party leader. Her mother, Judy Brooks Reed, is from a prominent and wealthy Nashville family. As a child, Reed's parents hosted and entertained guests such as William F. Buckley Jr. and George and Barbara Bush.

Career 
Reed wrote her first article for the Washington Bureau of Newsweek magazine in 1980,  covering the story of her former Madeira headmistress, Jean Harris' murder of partner Herman Tarnower. She continued with the magazine as a contributing editor and columnist.

Reed was a columnist at Garden & Gun from 2011. She was also an editor and writer for Vogue magazine since 1988, where she wrote about politics and culture and profiled the Clintons and Bushes, also interviewing Oprah Winfrey for The Wall Street Journal. She was a contributor to The New York Times, Conde Nast Traveler, The Wall Street Journal, U.S. News & World Report, and Elle Décor, among other publications.

She expanded the Delta Hot Tamale Festival from one-day to a three-day event, exponentially increasing the economic benefit to her hometown.  Reed opened Brown Water Books, a bookstore in the historic Wetherbee House in Greenville. She was co-founder of Reed-Smythe, an online business supporting independent artisans.
In 2019, she was named Cultural Ambassador of Mississippi’s Arts Commission. She served on the board of the Ogden Museum of Art in New Orleans, the Eudora Welty Foundation, and the Link Stryjewski Foundation.

Personal 
Reed was married to John Pearce; the couple divorced in 2016. She maintained two residences, one in New Orleans and the other in Mississippi, on a property adjacent to her childhood home.

Selected works 
Her books include:
 But Mama Always Puts Vodka in Her Sangria 2013
 Ham Biscuits, Hostess Gowns, and Other Southern Specialties
 Queen of the Turtle Derby and Other Southern Phenomena.
 The House on First Street: My New Orleans Story (P.S.)
 Julia Reed’s New Orleans: Food, Fun, and Field Trips for Letting the Good Times Roll
 Julia Reed's South: Spirited Entertaining and High-Style Fun All Year Long
 One Man's Folly: The Exceptional Houses of Furlow Gatewood
 South Toward Home: Adventures and Misadventures in My Native Land 2018
 S Is for Southern: A Guide to the South, from Absinthe to Zydeco (Garden & Gun Books)

References 

1960 births
2020 deaths
20th-century American women
21st-century American non-fiction writers
21st-century American women writers
20th-century American people